Lusamba Vanessa Kalala, better known as Lu Kala (stylized in all caps), is a Congolese-Canadian singer and songwriter.

Career 
Kala performed at the Canadian Music Week in 2019 where she performed her debut single, "DCMO (Don't Count Me Out)". She also won the grand prize at Royal Bank of Canada's Emerging Musician Program, earning $10,000 worth of studio time among other prizes.

"DCMO (Don't Count Me Out)" was described as "powerful" by Complex. Kala's second single, "Body Knew", was praised by Unheard Gems and Sidedoor. Her third single, "Want You" also received good reviews from critics. Sidedoor described her 2020 single "No Smoke" as "upbeat, catchy, and empowering".
Kala was featured on the Latto track ‘Lottery’, marking her first entry on the Billboard Hot 100.

References

External links 
Official website
 

Living people
21st-century Canadian women singers
Year of birth missing (living people)
21st-century Democratic Republic of the Congo women singers